The Geschiedenis der Vaderlandsche Schilderkunst, often called Van Eynden and Van der Willigen, is a 19th-century dictionary of artist biographies from the Netherlands published 1816-1842.

The reference work was started by Roeland van Eynden, a painter and writer from the Northern Netherlands, as a follow-up to the work published by Arnold Houbraken and Jan van Gool. The work was published first in two volumes listing painters active before 1800. The third volume was published with contemporary painters, and it was finished after Van Eynden's death by publishing a 4th volume with corrections and additions which was written by his friend and colleague, Adriaan van der Willigen, a Dutch writer known for his travelogues.

References

External links
Geschiedenis der vaderlandse schilderkunst on Google Books
Geschiedenis der Vaderlandsche Schilderkunst in the RKD

19th-century books
1816 non-fiction books
1842 non-fiction books
Art history books
Biographies about artists
Dutch biographical dictionaries
Dutch biographies
Van Eynden en Van der Willigen